Byomkesh Bakshi is an Indian-Bengali detective character created by Sharadindu Bandyopadhyay. Referring himself as "truth-seeker" or Satyanweshi in the stories, Bakshi is known for his proficiency with observation, logical reasoning, and forensic science which he uses to solve complicated cases, usually murders occurred in Kolkata and Dhaka.
Bakshi, 
Initially appearing in the 1932 story Satyanweshi, the character's popularity immensely increased in West Bengal and other parts of India and Bangladesh.

Many film, television, radio, audio drama and other adaptations that have been made of Sharadindu Bandyopadhyay's series of detective novels featuring his character, Byomkesh.

Books
Saradindu Bandopadhyay penned 32 Byomkesh stories from 1932 to 1970 prior to his death. In his early stories, Ajit Kumar Banerjee is described as his companion, and chronicler of his stories. But in some cases Ajit also investigates in absence of Byomkesh (examples, Makorshar Rosh, Shoilo Rahasya). The stories are all written in traditional formal Bengali language. However, later the stories shift to more colloquial language. The later stories (Room Nombor Dui, Chhlonar Chhondo, Shajarur Kanta, Benisonghaar and Lohar Biskut) are not penned by Ajit, who was engaged in his publication business.

The stories are not very complicated but very engaging, with a long series of surprising events. The stories present a range of crimes from the first story, Satyanweshi, where Byomkesh destroys an international drug racket, to household mysteries and crimes like Arthamanartham and Makorshar Rosh.

Sharadindu did not want to continue the Byomkesh stories, due to which he stopped writing from 1938 to 1951. During that time he busied himself writing scripts for films in Bombay. After his return to West Bengal, Byomkesh stories were still in demand so he wrote Chitrachor (Picture Imperfect) in 1951 and other stories gradually on to 1970, when his last story "Bishupal Badh" (Killing of Bishupal) was left incomplete owing to his untimely death.

List
There are 32 published and 1 unpublished Byomkesh stories. The list is chronologically arranged.

Color key
  indicates "story".
  indicates "novel".
  indicates unfinished writings.

Television and web

 Sushant Singh Rajput and Anand Tiwari reprised their roles from Detective Byomkesh Bakshy! in a 2015 episode of the long running Indian TV Series C.I.D. to promote the films.
 Actor Abir Chatterjee and Ritwick Chakraborty promoted the film Byomkesh Pawrbo in a daily soap Goyenda Ginni in Zee Bangla, as themselves respectively.

Radio
The Sunday Suspense series of 98.3 Radio Mirchi (Kolkata) adapted several novels of Byomkesh Bakshi for audio stories which include Satyanweshi, Pother Kanta, Makorshar Rosh, Agnibaan, Roktomukhi Neela, Khunji Khunji Nari, Arthamanartham, Adwitiyo, Monimondon, Cholonar Chondo, Lohar Biscuit, Achin Pakhi, Sajarur Kanta, Durgo Rohosyo and Chitrachor, performed by Mir Afsar Ali as Byomkesh and Deep as Ajit.

Audio drama 
The Satyanweshi audio drama series created by actor Aneesh See Yay adapted twenty two novels and seven original audio drama of Byomkesh Bakshi in Malayalam Language

Films

Video games

A hidden objects game for mobile devices called Detective Byomkesh Bakshy!: The Game was released by Games2win in 2015.

Legacy
 A popular fictional detective named "Vyomkesh", has been referenced by Sita in Amish Tripathi's book Sita: Warrior of Mithila.
 He was referred in The Big Bang Theory episode named "The Mommy Observation".

See also
Sharadindu Bandyopadhyay
Uttam Kumar
Rajit Kapur
Gaurav Chakrabarty

References

Byomkesh Bakshi
Byomkesh Bakshi films
Indian detective films
Films based on Indian novels
Television shows based on Indian novels